Jillian Jeanette Hooks is a New Zealand accountancy academic. She was a professor at the Massey University and published a number of books and papers on accounting and financial reporting.

Academic career
Hooks completed a 2000 PhD at the University of Waikato titled "Accountability in the retail and distribution sectors of the New Zealand electricity industry" and the Electricity sector in New Zealand remains a strong research topic. She works at Massey University, where she is a full professor. Other research interests include reporting (both industry, charities and public sector) and talent flows. Hooks is a Chartered accountant of the NZ Institute of Chartered Accountants, a Fellow Certified Practising Accountant of CPA Australia, and a convenor of the annual Auckland Region Accounting Conference. She is on the editorial board of Pacific Accounting Review and a member of the trust for that journal.

In 2011, she was voted lecturer of the year by students.

Selected works 
 Hooks, Jill, David Coy, and Howard Davey. "The information gap in annual reports." Accounting, Auditing & Accountability Journal 15, no. 4 (2002): 501–522.
 van Staden, Chris J., and Jill Hooks. "A comprehensive comparison of corporate environmental reporting and responsiveness." The British accounting review 39, no. 3 (2007): 197–210.
 Hooks, Jill, and Chris J. van Staden. "Evaluating environmental disclosures: The relationship between quality and extent measures." The British Accounting Review 43, no. 3 (2011): 200–213.
 Stent, Warwick, Michael Bradbury, and Jill Hooks. "IFRS in New Zealand: effects on financial statements and ratios." Pacific accounting review 22, no. 2 (2010): 92–107.
 Inkson, Kerr, Stuart Carr, Margot Edwards, Jill Hooks, Duncan Jackson, Kaye Thorn, and Nicola Allfree. "From brain drain to talent flow: Views of Kiwi expatriates." University of Auckland Business Review 6, no. 2 (2004): 29–39.
Emery, Michelle, Jill Hooks, and Ross Stewart. "Born at the wrong time? An oral history of women professional accountants in New Zealand." Accounting History 7, no. 2 (2002): 7–34.
Tooley, Stuart, Jill Hooks, and Norida Basnan. "Performance reporting by Malaysian local authorities: identifying stakeholder needs." Financial Accountability & Management 26, no. 2 (2010): 103–133.
Michael Bradbury, Jill Hooks, (2013) "Pacific Accounting Review – the first 25 years", Pacific accounting review, Vol. 25 Iss: 3, pp. 225–234

References

External links
  
 

Living people
Year of birth missing (living people)
New Zealand women academics
Academic staff of the Massey University
University of Waikato alumni
New Zealand accountants
New Zealand women writers